Years of Grace is a 1930 novel by Margaret Ayer Barnes. It won the Pulitzer Prize for the Novel in 1931. Despite this, it is not her best-known work; that honor belongs to Dishonored Lady, a play she co-wrote with Edward Sheldon, which was adapted twice into film (first as Letty Lynton and later with its actual title).

Barnes' alma mater, Bryn Mawr College, along with the characters of college presidents M. Carey Thomas and Marion Park figure prominently in this work. The story, beginning in the 1890s and continuing into the 1930s, chronicles the life of Jane Ward Carver from her teens to age fifty-four. This novel follows many of the same themes as Barnes' other works. Centering on the social manners of upper middle class society, her female protagonists are often traditionalists, struggling to uphold conventional morality in the face of changing social climates.

References

External links
 Photos of first edition of Years of Grace

1930 American novels
Pulitzer Prize for the Novel-winning works
Bryn Mawr College
Novels set in Pennsylvania
Houghton Mifflin books
1930 debut novels